HB-Flugtechnik GmbH (originally HB-Aircraft Industries Luftfahrtzeug) is an Austrian aircraft manufacturer established in the early 1970s by Heino Brditschka to produce light aircraft of his own design, originally the HB-21 motorglider.

The company started in flight training and light aircraft maintenance and then building light aircraft. From there it progressed to building microlights, with the introduction of the HB-Flugtechnik HB-208 Amigo.

Products

 HB-Flugtechnik HB-202
 HB-Flugtechnik HB-207 Alfa
 HB-Flugtechnik HB-208 Amigo
 HB-Flugtechnik HB-400
 HB-Flugtechnik Cubby
 HB-Flugtechnik Dandy
 HB-Flugtechnik Tornado
 HB-Flugtechnik HB 21
 HB-Flugtechnik HB 23/2400

References

External links

 

Aircraft manufacturers of Austria